The 915th Aircraft Control and Warning Squadron is an inactive United States Air Force unit. It was last assigned to the Duluth Air Defense Sector, Air Defense Command, stationed at Sioux Lookout Air Station, Ontario, Canada. It was inactivated on 1 October 1962.

The unit was a General Surveillance Radar squadron providing for the air defense of North America.

Lineage
 Constituted as the 915th Aircraft Control and Warning Squadron
 Activated on 10 March 1952
 Inactivated on 1 October 1962

Assignments
 32d Air Division, 10 March 1952
 31st Air Division, 16 December 1952
 37th Air Division, 1 January 1959
 30th Air Division, 1 April 1959
 Duluth Air Defense Sector, 15 November 1959 - 1 October 1962

Stations
 Grenier AFB, New Hampshire, 10 March 1952
 Sioux Lookout Air Station, 5 December 1952 - 1 October 1962

References

 Cornett, Lloyd H. and Johnson, Mildred W., A Handbook of Aerospace Defense Organization  1946 - 1980,  Office of History, Aerospace Defense Center, Peterson AFB, CO (1980).

External links

Radar squadrons of the United States Air Force
Aerospace Defense Command units